The Eswatini national under-16 basketball team is a national basketball team of Eswatini, administered by the Basketball Association of Eswatini (BASE).

It represents the country in international under-16 (under age 16) basketball competitions.

It appeared at the 2009 FIBA Africa Under-16 Championship qualifying round.

See also
Eswatini men's national basketball team
Eswatini women's national under-16 basketball team

References

External links
Swaziland Basketball Records at FIBA Archive

U-17
Men's national under-16 basketball teams